Keppy Ekpenyong Edet Bassey-Inyang  is a Nigerian actor who received a commendation award from the Actors Guild of Nigeria in 2018 for his contributions to Nollywood. The inscription on the award plaque reads “In recognition of your excellent service, dedication, and commitment to the development of the Nigerian Movie Industry”

Early life and education
Ekpenyong born on 21 March in Military Hospital, Yaba, Lagos State hails from Akwa-Ibom State. A south-south geographical region of Nigeria is predominantly occupied by minority tribes in Nigeria. Ekpenyong received all his education from primary level to tertiary level in Nigeria. He attended Corona Schools Crèche, Ikoyi and Corona School Victoria Island to obtain primary education. He attended Government College Ojo secondary school where he obtained his West African Senior School Certificate. Ekpenyong attended the University Of Calabar In Cross River State and obtained a Bachelor of Arts Degree in Linguistics and in 1982 obtained a Masters's Degree in International Law and Diplomacy from the University of Lagos.

Career
Ekpenyong began acquiring his acting skills during his NYSC service with the NTA. Ekpenyong functioned In the Programmes Department and worked as an intern under the supervision of Nigerian ace director; Tade Ogidan. In 1987 and 1988 he was trained and involved in Drama, Script-Writing, Voice- Over, Producing, and Presenting. After his  NYSC service he was featured in the soap opera Ripples where he played airline pilot Hassan Suleman. When the Nigerian movie industry began to blossom he switched from soap opera to home videos. In 1993 he co-produced a movie titled Unforgiven Sin.

In 2018, the 10th BON edition award show was hosted by Ekpenyong and Nigerian female comedian Helen Paul.

Awards
Ekpenyong won City People Movie Lifetime Achievement Award at the City People Entertainment Awards.
Commendation Award (2018) by Actors Guild of Nigeria.

Personal life
Ekpenyong is married and has two children.

Selected filmography
Black Mamba (2002)
Princess Butem (2003)
Turn Table (2004)
Schemers: Bad Babes (2004)
Little Angel (2004)
Dark Secret (2004)
Too Much Money (2005)
The Barons (2005)
Emotional Hazard (2005)
Anini (2005)
Total Control (2006)
Lady of Faith (2006)
The Accursed (2007)
On Bended Knees (2007)
Life Bullet (2007)
Double Game (2007)
Changing Faces (2008)
Smoke & Mirrors (2008)
Inale (2010)
Conversations at Dinner (2013)
St. Mary (2014)
93 Days (2016)
Hire A Man (2017)
Nneka the Pretty Serpent (2020)
Blood Sisters (2022)
Ije Awele (2022)

Tv series
Dere (TV Series, 2017)
King of Boys: The Return of the King (2021)

See also
 List of Nigerian actors
 List of Nigerian film producers

References

External links
 IMDb Page of Keppy-Ekpenyong

Living people
21st-century Nigerian male actors
Year of birth missing (living people)
Nigerian male television actors
Actors from Lagos State
University of Lagos alumni
Nigerian male film actors
Actors from Akwa Ibom State
People from Akwa Ibom State
Nigerian television personalities
University of Calabar alumni
Nigerian television presenters
Nigerian film producers
Nigerian screenwriters